Patrick Cosgrave is an Irish entrepreneur. He is a co-founder of Web Summit, an annual technology conference. In 2015 he was listed 18th in the Wired UK list of the most influential people in Europe in the field of technology.

Early life and education

Cosgrave grew up on a farm in County Wicklow.   He was educated at Glenstal Abbey School and Trinity College Dublin, where he studied Business, Economics and Social Studies (BESS). While at Trinity he was president of the University Philosophical Society (The Phil) and editor of Piranha, a satirical college magazine. During his presidency of The Phil, the society introduced Phil Speaks, an outreach initiative aimed at promoting debating and public speaking in Irish secondary schools. Cosgrave graduated with a II-1 BA from Trinity College, Dublin's BESS program in 2006.

Career
Cosgrave was the executive director of Rock the Vote Ireland, a campaign launched in April 2007 to encourage young people to vote in the May 2007 Irish general election. He was a co-founder of MiCandidate, a website that "provided detailed information on every candidate running in the 2007 general election". The company was sold for "an undisclosed sum" in October 2009.  Cosgrave is a co-founder of the Web Summit and F.ounders conferences.

Cosgrave was awarded the 2015 Irish Exporters Association annual gold medal. He was listed 18th in the 2015 Wired UK list of the "100 most influential individuals in the wider Wired world".

Cosgrave is an Ambassador for the European Innovation Council for the years 2021-2027.

Controversies 
In March 2012, Cosgrave was appointed to the board of the Higher Education Authority. While still a member of the board in 2014, Cosgrave said that his company would recruit graduates with first class honours degrees from most universities, but with II.1 degrees from Trinity College Dublin, the grade which Cosgrave had achieved. The Higher Education Authority distanced itself from Cosgrave's comments. Cosgrave subsequently resigned from the board in 2015.

The Web Summit has also been the subject of several controversies under Cosgrave's stewardship, including its move from Dublin to Lisbon, the organisation of a dinner at Portugal's National Pantheon, and the invitation of Marine Le Pen as a speaker, which was subsequently withdrawn.

In November 2021, an Irish High Court case was filed while the Web Summit conference was underway in Portugal, marking an intensification of the legal battle between the two co-founders of the event. Paddy Cosgrave has been accused of oppressing a minority shareholder, attempting to engage in blackmail against a co-director, and hacking a rival Irish events company. In the same month, Cosgrave was accused by a former director of Web Summit of regularly demeaning and chastising staff members.

Criticism for comments 
Cosgrave has come under criticism and faced legal action for comments he has made on multiple occasions, particularly about politicians.

Cosgrave criticised the Irish tax system in 2019, which was rejected as hypocrisy as Amaranthine, an investment fund set up by Cosgrave with other Web Summit founders, is based in California but registered in Delaware - an effective tax shelter. 

On 30 March 2020, Cosgrave posted a tribute on Twitter to the "4 nurses in Ireland who fought so hard for so many patients, but who themselves fell ill, and have now passed. RIP." The following day, the Health Service Executive tweeted that "Contrary to tweets sent yesterday - thankfully none of our nurses have died in Ireland from #COVID19." Phil Ni Sheaghdha, general secretary of the Irish Nurses & Midwives Organisation (INMO), accused Cosgrave of "scaremongering". On 8 June, Cosgrave "unreservedly" apologised on Twitter to the HSE and the INMO. 

In 2020, Dr Maitiú Ó Tuathail took legal proceedings against Cosgrave regarding comments Cosgrave made on his Twitter profile. The case was settled outside of court.

Also in 2020, Cosgrave was criticised for using what some inferred as sectarian and pejorative language in calling Neale Richmond a "Castle Catholic".

In 2022, Cosgrave was sued by John McGuirk for defamation for Tweets posted in December 2021.

Personal life 
Cosgrave is married to Faye Dinsmore. The couple lives in Dublin with their son.

References

External links

 Web Summit's official website

Living people
Businesspeople from Dublin (city)
Alumni of Trinity College Dublin
People educated at Glenstal Abbey School
People from County Wicklow
Year of birth missing (living people)
People associated with Trinity College Dublin